Tarek El-Molla (born June 1962) is an Egyptian engineer and current Minister of Petroleum & Mineral Resources.

Career
El-Molla graduated with a Bachelor of Mechanical Engineering from Cairo University in 1986. He worked for international oil company Chevron Corporation in 1987–2010. In 2011 he joined Egyptian General Petroleum Corporation, which he headed from August 2013 to September 2015.

On 19 September 2015, he has sworn in as the Minister of Petroleum & Mineral Resources.

C.V. 
 Received his B.Sc. in Mechanical Engineering from the Cairo University in 1986.
 Joined Chevron (Egypt) in Jan. 1987.
 Worked in different fields and held various positions in Engineering, Operations, Planning, Sales and Marketing.
 In 1998, he became Sales Manager and Member of the Board of Directors of Chevron Egypt S.A.E.
 During the period from 2002 until 2008, he got several Chevron assignments and managed projects in Dubai, Kenya & Singapore.
 In 2008, he became Managing Director–Marketing of Chevron Egypt.
 From 2008 until the end of 2010, he moved to Chevron South Africa, held the position of Regional Manager in charge of South & Central Africa's Commercial & Industrial Business.
 In Jan. 2011, he joined EGPC as the Deputy CEO for Foreign Trade. During this period of time (2011–2013), he was also assigned as Deputy CEO for both Internal Trade & Operations.
 He was appointed as EGPC's CEO in Aug. 2013.
 On 19 September 2015, he was appointed as Minister of Petroleum and Mineral Resources.
 On 14 June 2018, Eng. Tarek El Molla has sworn in as Minister of Petroleum and Mineral Resources, in the new Government of the Prime Minister, Dr. Mostafa Madbouly.

Accolades 
On 10 May 2017, the French President awarded him the Legion of Honor Medal with the rank of Knight, in recognition of his efforts in advancing Egyptian-French relations in the oil and gas industry.

On 10 November 2020, the President of the Hellenic Republic awarded him the "Grand Commander of the Order of Phoenix".

References 

1962 births
Egyptian engineers
Petroleum ministers of Egypt
Cairo University alumni
Living people
Chevron Corporation people
21st-century Egyptian politicians